The Champions Chess Tour (CCT) 2023 is an online (online) fast chess tournament circuit that will be organised in 2023 by Chess.com. The tour will start on 6 February 2023 and will last until 15 December 2023 involving eight online chess tournaments featuring some of the world's top players, who will play for a prize money pool of US$2 million.

Organisation and format 
With Chess.com's purchase of Play Magnus Group, the 2023 Champions Chess Tour will take its format components from previous seasons of the Champions Chess Tour and Chess.com tournaments, such as the Chess.com World Championship. Some of these enhancements to the contest will include open qualifications and a division structure to accommodate more players. There are also several inventive format tweaks created to increase excitement and make every match matter.

The new concept includes six tournaments over the course of an entire online chess season, beginning with the Airthings Masters and continuing with playoffs and an knockout final. The qualifying tournaments of the Champions Chess Tour 2023 are open to all top 500 players in the rapid chess ranking. The tournaments consists of six $235,000 tournaments. The top ten finishers in the overall standings will each get an additional $100,000 prize. The top finishers on the leaderboard will fill the remaining seats in the $500,000 end-of-year finals in December, leaving the event champions with a golden ticket, with eight players playing a semi finals and four playing the final in December 2023.

All titled players may compete in the qualifying rounds, with the exception of grandmasters, who are automatically entered into the play-in rounds. There are nine rounds of a Swiss-system tournament during qualifiers. The time limit is 10 minutes plus 2 seconds. The top three competitors in each competition will have the chance to take part in the forthcoming Play-In.

Tour points and prize money

Regular 
The total prize pool for a Regular tournament is $235,000 for each tournmeant are distributed as follows:

Playoffs and Finals 
The Playoffs and Finals have a $500,000 purse.

Leaderboard prizes 
After the end of the sixth event, players also earn their share of the $100,000 prize fund according to their CCT Tour Point standings.

Tournament schedule and results

Tournaments details

Airthings Masters 
This initial tournament started on 6 February and ended on 10 February. Both a Play-in stage that is open to all grandmasters and a Knockout stage with three categories are available at the Airthings Masters. The prize pools for each category are distinct, and players can gain Tour Points according on the division they competed in and their finish. The players who have earned the most Tour Points by the tour's sixth event qualify for the CCT Playoff.  Magnus Carlsen won the tournament after defeating Hikaru Nakamura in Division I finals. Fabiano Caruana won Division II after defeating Yu Yangyi.

References 

Chess competitions
2023 in chess